The sergeant major of the South African Air Force is the most senior warrant officer. The post was created in 1979. It is a singular appointment, held by only one person at any time. The sergeant major of the Air Force reports to the chief of the Air Force and is responsible for maintaining discipline.

Rank and insignia

Before 2008, all sergeant majors of the Air Force were warrant officer class 1, with appointment to the position of sergeant major. In 2008, the SANDF expanded the warrant officer ranks and the sergeant major of the Air Force now holds the rank of senior chief warrant officer.

Before 2002, the sergeant major of the Air Force had a unique rank insignia, consisting of a warrant officer class 1 insignia with the South African Air Force badge above it. 
Following the warrant officer rank redesign, the sergeant major of the Air Force does not have a unique rank insignia.

List of officeholders

See also

 South African Air Force
 South African military ranks

References

South African Air Force
Warrant officers